Karl Dickson (born 2 August 1982 in Salisbury, England), is an English professional rugby union referee and former player. He is pursuing a career as a referee and coaches at St. John's School, Leatherhead. He previously played for Bedford Blues and Harlequins as a scrum half.

Early life
Dickson started rugby at Barnard Castle School and is a graduate from Coventry University. The Salisbury born scrum half is a graduate of the Bedford Blues academy system.

Club career
He was promoted to Bedford's senior team in 2004 and made over 100 appearances for the club until 2009 when he joined Harlequins. Although Karl was usually selected behind England scrum half Danny Care at Quins, he remained highly rated within the club with Harlequins Director of Rugby Conor O'Shea stating that he believed Dickson to be "among the best five scrum halves in the country".

He was a replacement for Harlequins in their 2011–12 Premiership final victory over Leicester Tigers.

On 24 April 2017, Dickson announced his retirement from professional rugby playing at the end of 2016–17 Aviva Premiership season. He would continue his rugby career as a professional referee.

International career
Dickson was named in the England Saxons squad on 11 January 2012 but was called up to the England Squad for both the 2012 Six Nations and the South Africa tour due to injuries. Karl came off the bench in the second mid-week fixture against South African Barbarians North, replacing his younger brother Lee, but never received a full international cap.

Personal life
Dickson has twin daughters. His brother Lee Dickson is also a professional rugby player.

Professional Referee
On 10 May 2017 it was announced Karl Dickson will join the Rugby Football Union's Professional Game Match Officials Team (PGMOT) next season following his retirement from rugby said a statement on the Harlequins official website.

Dickson began his refereeing qualifications in January 2014 and continued to play for Harlequins while gaining experience officiating. This was made possible by the fact he never made the starting XV.

Through the London Society of Referees he made his refereeing debut at the Reigate School 7s in March 2014 and since then has taken charge of a range of matches including schools, club juniors, sevens as well as local and national league clubs.

Last season he became a member of the National Panel as one of the best 55 referees in the country and was appointed to his first National League 1 fixture in October when Old Albanians played Loughborough Students.

Dickson has refereed two A League semi-finals, Exeter v Newcastle in 2016 and Gloucester v Wasps in 2017 and made his debut in the Greene King IPA Championship in the Christmas Eve match between London Irish and Richmond.  Three days later he was involved in Big Game 9 where Harlequins played Gloucester in the Aviva Premiership at Twickenham.

After 169 appearances for Harlequins scrum-half Dickson announced his retirement in April and joins the PGMOT in July.

Dickson said: "Over the last two years any time that I have had - a free Saturday or Sunday or even during the week - I would referee as many games as possible to get as much practice as I could.  Every game you learn something new and gain increasing match sharpness.

"I would always encourage players to plan for when they retire and the fact that I’ve been refereeing for three years already puts me in a position where I can look forward to starting with the team next season and, having refereed in a Championship game this year, hopefully officiate more at that level.  I wouldn't have this opportunity unless I started when I did.

Tony Spreadbury, Head of Professional Game Match Officials said: "I’ve been impressed by Karl's commitment, his attitude and his desire to go all the way in refereeing.  His experience at scrum half means he understands and has a good connection with both forward and back play.   We’re very much looking forward to him joining us full-time to continue his development.

In an interview to RPA, he said refereeing at international level was his "main goal", a goal reached when in October 2020, Karl was appointed as the main referee in a friendly game between France and Wales, in the Stade de France.

References

External links

1982 births
Living people
English rugby union players
English rugby union referees
Harlequin F.C. players
People educated at Barnard Castle School
Premiership Rugby referees
Rugby union players from Salisbury